Tullaberga Island is a small, uninhabited island off the coast of Victoria, Australia, near the town of Mallacoota. It is about 4 hectares (or 10 acres) in size.

On 15 May 1853, the SS Monumental City, on a run from Sydney to Melbourne, ran aground off Tullaberga Island and became a total wreck.

References

External links
Geological map of Tullaberga Island

Islands of Victoria (Australia)
Uninhabited islands of Australia